Humita (from Quechua humint'a) is a Native South American dish from pre-Hispanic times, a traditional food from the Andes and it can be found in Bolivia,  Chile, Ecuador, Peru, and Argentina. It consists of fresh choclo (Peruvian maize) pounded to a paste, wrapped in a fresh corn husk, and slowly steamed or boiled in a pot of water. In Bolivia it is known as huminta and in Brazil as pamonha.  Humitas are similar to Mexican uchepos, which are also made with fresh corn; but they are only superficially similar to tamales, which are made with nixtamalized corn (masa).

In Argentina

In Argentina, humitas are prepared with fresh corn, sautéed onions, pumpkin, and some spices, depending on the region or taste. The dough is wrapped in corn husks and boiled or it is cooked in a big pan and served in bowls. It is also common to add some diced cheese to the dough, typically queso fresco. They can be found in restaurants and markets in Jujuy,Tucumán, Salta, and other provinces of the north of Argentina.

In Chile
As in Ecuador, humitas in Chile are prepared with fresh corn, onion, basil, and butter or lard. They are wrapped in corn husks and baked or boiled. They may contain ají verde (green chili pepper). The humitas are kept together cooking with thread or twine. They can be made savory, sweet, or sweet and sour, served with added sugar, chile pepper, salt, tomato, olive and paprika etc. In Chile, humitas are traceable back to the 19th century.

In Ecuador
Ecuadorian humitas are prepared with fresh ground corn with onions, eggs and spices that vary from region to region, and also by each family's tradition. The dough is wrapped in a corn husk, but is steamed rather than baked or boiled. Ecuadorian humitas may also contain cheese. This dish is so traditional in Ecuador that they have developed special pots just for cooking humitas. Ecuadorian humitas can be salty or sweet.

In Peru and Bolivia
In the central Andes region, humitas are prepared with fresh corn combined with lard and salt and queso fresco for a savory dish or with fresh corn with lard, sugar, cinnamon and raisins for a sweet dish. Savory humitas may also be prepared with anise. These are typically very rare in other parts of South America.

These humitas are prepared with corn wrapped in corn husks and can be cooked in boiling water, placed in a pachamanca oven, or steamed. They can be wrapped in several ways.

One of the earliest references to huminta in Peru was written by the Inca Garcilaso de la Vega in his Comentarios Reales del Inca, which he published in Lisbon in 1609. In talking about huminta he describes his own memories of consumption about the time he lived in Peru between 1539 and 1560. From this it can be deduced that huminta was already prepared in Peru during this time.

See also

 Binaki
 Hallacas
 Pamonhas
 Pasteles
 Sarmales

References

External links 
 

Latin American cuisine
Mexican cuisine
Native American cuisine
Guatemalan cuisine
Ecuadorian cuisine
Chilean cuisine
Peruvian cuisine
Bolivian cuisine
Argentine cuisine
Maize dishes